The 2015–16 South of Scotland Football League, was the 70th season of the South of Scotland Football League, and the 2nd season as the sixth tier of the Scottish football pyramid system. Wigtown & Bladnoch were the defending champions.  

Crichton merged with North & South Lanarkshire AFA side Lochmaben to prevent the club folding, which included a return to Crichton Hospital Park.

St Cuthbert Wanderers won their thirteenth league title, but remained in the division as they 
did not meet the required licensing criteria for promotion to the Lowland League.

Teams

League table

References

5